The Judge and Clerk Islets are small islands, with a total land and reef area of no more than , lying  north of Macquarie Island in the southwestern Pacific Ocean.  They are, with Macquarie Island, part of Tasmania, Australia.  They are in the Macquarie Island Nature Reserve and were inscribed in 1997 on the UNESCO World Heritage Area, and form a Special Management Area within the nature reserve. They are very infrequently visited and are free of introduced animals and plants.

See also

 Bishop and Clerk Islets
 List of Antarctic and sub-Antarctic islands
 List of islands of Tasmania

References

Protected areas of Tasmania
Macquarie Island
Islands of Tasmania
Islands of the Pacific Ocean
Macquarie Island